Viktor Ivanovich Bondarenko (born 13 June 1949) is a Russian professional football coach and a former player who is mostly known for coaching in Africa for many years. He coached Mozambique twice.
In 2009, he managed Primeiro de Agosto, but was fired in July.

References

External links
 
 Viktor Bondarenko Interview

1949 births
Living people
Soviet footballers
FC SKA Rostov-on-Don players
FC Rostov players
Daugava Rīga players
Soviet football managers
Russian football managers
Mozambique national football team managers
Orlando Pirates F.C. managers
Moroka Swallows F.C. managers
Mamelodi Sundowns F.C. managers
Expatriate football managers in Mozambique
FC Dynamo Moscow managers
Russian Premier League managers
Expatriate football managers in Angola
C.D. Primeiro de Agosto managers
FC SKA Rostov-on-Don managers
Kabuscorp S.C.P. managers
Association football defenders
Russian expatriate football managers